SecondHandSongs (or Second Hand Songs) is a collaborative website that maintains a global database of mainly cover versions of original works. It also contains information about adaptations and samples. The website allows performers and volunteer curators to add songs and update their metadata.  It includes links to freely accessible recordings of the covers, and external identifiers for those works and performances in other databases.

As of 2021, it included roughly a million covers of 100,000 original works, and was cross-referenced by MusicBrainz.

Data and uses 
Data are contributed and edited by the active community, so the exact size of the database has changed over time. In 2007, the project included 60,000 covers.  As of 2020, it had reached a million covers.

Data schema and identifiers 
SecondHandSongs includes a work ID for each work, and a performance ID for each cover of a song by a performer.

A work is an equivalence class, i.e. a list, of performances of the same underlying song.  Each performer has, at most, one performance for each work in the database.

Derived datasets 
In 2011, the Million Song Dataset project released a SecondHandSongs subset (an intersection of SHS and MSD data).  At the time, this was the largest dataset of cover songs available for academic research.

Later, it released the SHS100k dataset for machine learning, with 100k covers of 10k works. This has since become a benchmark for cover-song identification.

See also
 WhoSampled, a similar website that also contains information about cover songs (as well as remixes), but is based more on samples and interpolations

References

External links 
 Search interface for the SHS database
 Under the covers

Internet properties established in 2003
Online music and lyrics databases
Cover versions